is a Japanese football player. He plays for Grulla Morioka.

Playing career
Sunao Kasahara joined to FC Ryukyu in 2014. In 2015, he moved to Saurcos Fukui. In 2016, he moved to Grulla Morioka.

Club statistics
Updated to 23 February 2018.

References

External links
Profile at Grulla Morioka

1989 births
Living people
Tokyo Gakugei University alumni
Association football people from Niigata Prefecture
Japanese footballers
J3 League players
FC Ryukyu players
Saurcos Fukui players
Iwate Grulla Morioka players
Association football goalkeepers